This is a list of flag bearers who have represented Czechoslovakia at the Olympics.

Flag bearers carry the national flag of their country at the opening ceremony of the Olympic Games.

See also
Czechoslovakia at the Olympics

References

Czechoslovakia at the Olympics
Czechoslovakia
Olympic flagbearers